Heikki Olavi Suomalainen (born 27 March 1947 in Sääminki) is a Finnish former marathon runner. He won the Boston Marathon in 1972 by an 18-second margin over Víctor Mora. In 1973 he finished third at the same race.

During his career, Olavi Suomalainen sustained injuries and failed to qualify for the Summer Olympics or European Championships in Athletics. He took the bronze medal at the Finnish Championship Marathon in the Olympic years 1972 and 1976. However, in 1976 gold medalist Håkan Spik, silver medalist Jukka Toivola, and Lasse Virén were nominated to the Olympic Marathon.

Suomalainens winning time 2:15:39 at the 1972's Boston Marathon remained his personal best. Olavi Suomalainen has a Master of Science in Engineering.

Achievements

References

External links
Report from the Boston Marathon 1972 by Boston Globe
Tilastopaja profile for Olavi Suomalainen (in Finnish)

1947 births
Living people
People from Savonlinna
Finnish male long-distance runners
Finnish male marathon runners
Boston Marathon male winners
Sportspeople from South Savo